William Rex Autrey (January 17, 1933 – September 12, 2020) was an American football player who played for Chicago Bears of the National Football League (NFL). He played college football at Stephen F. Austin State University.

He died on September 12, 2020, in Waco, Texas at age 87.

References

1933 births
2020 deaths
People from Robertson County, Texas
Players of American football from Texas
Chicago Bears players
Stephen F. Austin Lumberjacks football players
American football centers